WKAI is a 25,000 watt FM radio station on 100.1 MHz in Macomb, Illinois, in west-central Illinois.  WKAI has been on the air since June 6, 1966. It is owned by Fletcher Ford, through licensee Virden Broadcasting Corp.

Survey after survey shows K-100 to be the most popular radio station in McDonough County.  K-100 features contemporary hit music of the 80's, 90's and today along with local news, weather, sports and chances to win prizes several times each day. K-100 also carries live play-by-play of Macomb High School football and basketball, and other special sports broadcasts throughout the year.

History

 15 September 1965 — WKAI Broadcasting Company is granted permission to build a new FM radio station.
 1966 — WKAI-FM is added to the existing WKAI-AM (now WCAZ) at 1510 kHz and Macomb Daily Journal media properties owned by the Rudolph family.
 2005 — Construction permit filed with FCC to increase station power to 11.5 kW ERP.
 2009 — WKAI was transferred from WPW Broadcasting, Inc. in DeKalb, Illinois to Colchester Radio, Inc.
 November 30, 2015 — WKAI was sold to Virden Broadcasting Corp., along with five sister stations, for $725,000.

References

External links
 

Macomb, Illinois
Radio stations established in 1966
KAI
1966 establishments in Illinois